William Boyce (baptised 11 September 1711 – 7 February 1779) was an English composer and organist. Like Beethoven later on, he became deaf but continued to compose. He knew Handel, Arne, Gluck, Bach, Abel, and a very young Mozart, all of whom respected his work.

Life

Boyce was born in London, at Joiners Hall, then in Lower Thames Street, to John Boyce, at the time a joiner and cabinet-maker, and beadle of the Worshipful Company of Joiners and Ceilers, and his wife Elizabeth Cordwell. He was baptised on 11 September 1711 and was admitted by his father as a choirboy at St Paul's Cathedral in 1719. After his voice broke in 1727, he studied music with Maurice Greene.

His first professional appointment came in 1734 when he was employed as an organist at the Oxford Chapel in central London. He went on to take a number of similar posts before being appointed Master of the King's Musick in 1757 (he had applied for the post on the death of Maurice Greene in 1755) and becoming one of the organists at the Chapel Royal in 1758. He also gave lessons, his daughter telling the composer R. J. S. Stevens that both Thomas Linley the Elder and Thomas Linley the Younger had been his pupils in counterpoint in the period 1763–1768.

His work as a composer began in the 1730s, writing songs for Vauxhall Gardens. In 1736 he was named as composer to the Chapel Royal and wrote the oratorio David's Lamentation over Saul and Jonathan. He was engaged as conductor to the Three Choirs Festival in 1737; many of his works, including the Worcester Overture (today known as his Symphony no. 8), will have been premiered at the Festival over the succeeding years. The 1740s saw his opera Peleus and Thetis, the serenata Solomon, and his Secular Masque, to a libretto by John Dryden. In 1749 he wrote an ode and the anthem O be joyful to celebrate the installation of the Duke of Newcastle as Chancellor of Cambridge University, and was awarded the degree of Doctor of Music. In 1747 he had published his first purely instrumental composition, a set of "Twelve Sontas for Two Violins and a Bass" and these proved popular. Charles Burney wrote that they were "not only in constant use, as Chamber music, in private concerts ... but in our theatres, as act-tunes [i.e. intermezzi] and public gardens, as favourite pieces, during many years."

In the 1750s Boyce supplied David Garrick with songs and other music for many productions at the Drury Lane Theatre.  These included his own operas The Chaplet and The Shepherd's Lottery, both to libretti by Moses Mendez, and for Garrick's  1759 pantomime Harlequin's Invasion which contained what became Boyce's most famous song, Heart of Oak.

As Master of the King's Musick Boyce had the responsibility of writing music for royal occasions including funerals, weddings and coronations. He, however, refused to make a new setting of Zadok the Priest for the coronation of George III in 1761 on the grounds that Handel's setting of the anthem was unsurpassable – as a consequence of which Handel's setting has been played at every subsequent British coronation.

By the year 1758, his deafness had increased to such an extent that he was unable to continue in his organist posts. He resolved to give up teaching and to retire to Kensington, and devote himself to editing the collection of church music which bears his name. He retired and worked on completing the compilation Cathedral Music that his teacher Greene had left incomplete at his death. This led to Boyce editing works by the likes of William Byrd and Henry Purcell. Many of the pieces in the collection are still used in Anglican services today.

On 7 February 1779 Boyce died from an attack of gout. He was buried under the dome of St Paul's Cathedral. His only son, also William Boyce (25 March 1764 – 1824), was a professional double bass player.

Legacy

Boyce was largely forgotten after his death and he remains a little-performed composer today, although a number of his pieces were rediscovered in the 1930s and Constant Lambert edited and sometimes conducted his works. Lambert had already launched the early stages of the modern Boyce revival in 1928, when he published the first modern edition of the Eight Symphonies (Bartlett and Bruce 2001). The great exception to this neglect was his church music, which was edited after his death by Philip Hayes and published in two large volumes, Fifteen Anthems by Dr Boyce in 1780 and A Collection of Anthems and a Short Service in 1790 (Bartlett 2003, 54).

Church choral music saw a revival in the 1830s and 1840s, under the influences of the Tractarians, the Cambridge Camden Society, and the financial changes carried out under the "Dean and Chapter Act" (the Ecclesiastical Commissioners Act 1840). A new edition of Boyce's works as Cathedral Music, edited by Joseph Warren, appeared in 1849.

The first movement (Allegro) of Boyce's Symphony No. 1 in B-flat was the first piece of music played during the procession of the bride and bridegroom at the conclusion of the wedding of Prince Harry and Meghan Markle in 2018.

Boyce's portraits were painted by Joshua Reynolds and Thomas Hudson. He was drawn and engraved by John Keyse Sherwin, and a vignette made by Drayton after Robert Smirke.

Works

See List of compositions by William Boyce

References

Sources
 Bruce, Robert J. 2005. "Boyce, William (bap. 1711, d. 1779)", Oxford Dictionary of National Biography, Oxford University Press, [2004; online edition, Oct 2005; subscription or UK library membership required]

Further reading
 Bartlett, Ian, and Robert J. Bruce. 2001. "Boyce, William". The New Grove Dictionary of Music and Musicians, second edition, edited by Stanley Sadie and John Tyrrell. London: Macmillan Publishers.
 Bartlett, Ian. 2003. "Lambert, Finzi and the Anatomy of the Boyce Revival". Musical Times 144, no. 1884 (Autumn): 54–59.
 Bartlett, Ian and Robert J. Bruce. 2011. "William Boyce: a tercentenary sourcebook and compendium". Cambridge: Cambridge Scholars Publishing.
 Bartlett, Ian, and Robert J. Bruce. 2001. "Boyce, William". The New Grove Dictionary of Music and Musicians, second edition, edited by Stanley Sadie and John Tyrrell. London: Macmillan Publishers.
 Kenyon, Nicholas. 1978–79. "William Boyce (1711–1779)" Music and Musicians 27, no. 6:24–27.

External links

 
 
 
 William Boyce – biography
 William Boyce's "Solomon" (Oxford Journals – Music and Letters)
 Portraits of Boyce (National Portrait Gallery, London)

1711 births
1779 deaths
English classical organists
British male organists
Deaf classical musicians
Members of the Royal Society of Musicians
Classical composers of church music
People educated at St. Paul's Cathedral School
Pupils of Johann Christoph Pepusch
Musicians from London
English male classical composers
English classical composers
18th-century classical composers
18th-century British male musicians
18th-century English composers
18th-century keyboardists
Composers of masonic music
English deaf people
English opera composers
Masters of the King's Music
Male classical organists